Leonard or Leo is a common English masculine given name and a surname.

The given name and surname originate from the Old High German Leonhard containing the prefix levon ("lion") from the Greek Λέων ("lion") through the Latin Leo, and the suffix hardu ("brave" or "hardy"). The name has come to mean "lion strength", "lion-strong", or "lion-hearted". Leonard was the name of a Saint in the Middle Ages period, known as the patron saint of prisoners.

Leonard is also an Irish origin surname, from the Gaelic O'Leannain also found as O'Leonard, but often was anglicised to just Leonard, consisting of the prefix O ("descendant of") and the suffix Leannan ("lover"). The oldest public records of the surname appear in 1272 in Huntingdonshire, England, and in 1479 in Ulm, Germany.

Variations 
The name has variants in other languages:
 Leen, Leendert, Lenard (Dutch)
 Lehnertz, Lehnert (Luxembourgish)
 Len (English)
 :hu:Lénárd (Hungarian)
 Lenart (disambiguation) (Slovene)
 Linhart (Czech)
 Lennard, diminutive forms Lenny
 Lennart (Swedish, Estonian, Dutch)
 Lennert (German, Dutch)
 Lev (Ukrainian)
 Lenni (Finnish)
 Lenno (Groningen)
 Lenny (English)
 Leo (many languages)
 Leon (English, German, Dutch, Russian)
 Léon (French), León (Spanish)
 Léonard (French)
 Leonard = "Renata" in Māori, Waitaha
 Leonardo (Italian, Spanish, and Portuguese)
 Leonhard, Leonhardt (German)
 Leontxo (Basque)
 O'Leannáin
 O'Lionaird

In other languages 
Armenian: Լեոնարդ (Leonard)
Croatian: Leonard
Czech: Leonard
French: Léonard
Georgian: ლეონარდ (Leonard)
German: Leonard, Leonhard, Leonhardt, Lennart
Greek: Λεονάρδος (Leonárdos)
Hebrew: לֵב־אֲרִי (Lév-Ari)
Hungarian: Lénárd, Leonárd
Italian: Leonardo
Latvian: Linards
 Lithuanian: Leonardas
Māori: Renātā
Maltese: Nardu
Polish: Leonard
Portuguese: Leonardo
Romanian: Leonard
Russian: Леонард (Leonard)
Serbian: Леонард (Leonard)
Spanish: Leonardo
Swedish: Lennart
Yiddish: לעאָנאַרד (Leonard)
Ukrainian: Лев

Given name

Leonard Adleman (born 1945), American computer scientist
Léonard Autié (1751–1820), French hairdresser
Leonard Baskin (1922–2000), American artist
Leonard Bernstein (1918–1990), American conductor and composer
Leonard Burton (born 1964), American football player
Leonard of Chios (died 1458), Catholic archbishop
Leonard Cohen (1934–2016), Canadian singer-songwriter
Leonard Cheshire (1917–1992), British philanthropist
Leonard Doroftei (born 1970), Romanian boxer
Leonhard Euler (1707–1783), Swiss mathematician
Leonardo Fibonacci (c. 1170 – after 1240), Italian mathematician
Leonard Fairley (born 1951), American football player
Leonard Fournette (born 1995), American football player
Leonhard Fuchs (1501–1566), German physician and natural historian
Leonard Hackney (1855–1938), Justice of the Indiana Supreme Court
Leonard Hoffmann, Baron Hoffmann (born 1934), British judge
Leonard Humphries (born 1970), American football player
Leonard Labatt (1838–1897), Swedish tenor
Leonard Lance (born 1952), American politician
Leonard Lansink (born 1956), German actor
Leonard "Lenny" Kravitz (born 1964), American singer and songwriter
Leonard M. Kravitz (1931–1951), American soldier and Medal of Honor recipient
Leonard Francis Lindoy (born 1937), Australian chemist
Leonard Livingston (1920–1998), Australian cricketer
Leonard Maltin (born 1950), American film critic and film historian
Leonard Mlodinow (born 1954), American physicist and writer
Leonard Nimoy (1931–2015), American actor and film director
Leonard of Noblac (died 559), Frankish nobleman
Leonard Peikoff (born 1933), Canadian philosopher
Leonard Peltier(born 1944), American Activist 
Leonard Pitts (born 1957), American journalist
Leonard of Port Maurice (1676–1751), Italian saint
Abeyratne Cudah Leonard Ratwatte (1909-1971), Sri Lankan Sinhala politician and diplomat
Leonard Roberts (born 1972), American actor
Leonard "Lennie" Rosenbluth (1933–2022), American basketball player
Leonard Rosenman (1924–2008), American composer
Leonard Rossiter (1926–1984), English actor
Leonard Alfred Schneider (1925–1966), AKA Lenny Bruce, American stand-up comedian, social critic, & satirist
Leonard Silverman (1930–2015), New York politician and judge
Leonard Slatkin (born 1944), American conductor
Leonard Steinberg, Baron Steinberg (1936–2009), British businessman
Leonard Stone (1923–2011), American actor
Leonard Sumner, indigenous Canadian singer-songwriter
Leonard Susskind (born 1940), American theoretical physicist
Leonard Thompson (footballer) (1901–1968), British football player
Leonard Merlyn Wickramasuriya (1916-2002), Sri Lankan Sinhala army brigadier
Leonard Woolley (1880–1960), British archaeologist
Leonard Wong, American military writer
Leonard Wu, American actor, writer and producer

Surname

A–F
 Ada Leonard (1915–1997), American bandleader
 Adam Leonard (singer-songwriter), English singer-songwriter
 Adna Wright Leonard, Methodist Bishop of Buffalo NY
 André-Joseph Léonard, Archbishop of Mechelen-Brussels
 Andrew Leonard, American technology journalist
 Andy Leonard, baseball
 Benny Leonard (born Benjamin Leiner; "The Ghetto Wizard", 1896–1947), American world champion Hall of Fame lightweight boxer
 Bill Leonard (politician), American politician
 Bobby Leonard (1932–2021), American basketball coach
 Brendon Leonard, rugby union
 Brian Leonard, American football
 Buck Leonard, baseball
 Cecil Leonard, American football
 Chuck Leonard (1937–2004), radio
 Conrad Leonard (1898–2003), pianist
 Cynthia Leonard, suffragist
 Deane Leonard (born 1999), American football player
 Dennis Leonard, baseball
 Dick Leonard, British politician
 Dutch Leonard (left-handed pitcher) (Hubert Benjamin Leonard), baseball
 Dutch Leonard (right-handed pitcher) (Emil John Leonard), baseball
 Edwin Leonard, American Civil War Medal of Honor recipient
 Ego Leonard, anonymous Dutch sculptor, painter, guerrilla artist
 Elijah Leonard, Canadian politician
 Elizabeth Weeks Leonard, American professor
 Elmore Leonard (1925–2013), American novelist
 Emery Clarence Leonard, American botanist
 Fred Churchill Leonard, American politician
 Frederick C. Leonard, American astronomer

G–L
 Gary Leonard, basketball
 George Leonard (1923–2010), American author
 Glenn Leonard (born 1947), American musician
 Gloria Leonard (1940–2014), actress
 Graham Leonard, Anglican Bishop converted to Catholicism
 Gustav Leonhardt (1928–2012), Dutch musician, conductor, musicologist
 Harlan Leonard (1905–1983), American jazz musician
 Harry Ward Leonard, inventor
 Herman Leonard, photographer
 Hookey Leonard, Scottish professional footballer
 Hubert Léonard (1819–1890), Belgian violinist
 Hugh Leonard (1926–2009), Irish playwright
 Isabel Leonard (born 1982), American operatic mezzo-soprano
 J. Paul Leonard (1901–1995), American university president, educator
 J. Rich Leonard, American judge
 Jack E. Leonard, comedian
 Jacqueline Leonard, Scottish actress
 James A. Leonard, American chess player
 Jason Leonard (born 1968), English rugby union player
 Jeffrey Leonard (born 1955), American baseball player
 Jerris Leonard, American politician
 Jim Leonard, American football
 Jimmy Leonard, Irish politician
 Joe Leonard, motorsports
 John J. Leonard, mayor of Bolingbrook, Illinois
 John Leonard (critic) (1939–2008), American critic, pen name Cyclops
 John Leonard (Gaelic footballer) (born 1976), Gaelic football goalkeeper
 John Leonard (poet) (born 1965), Australian poet
 Johnny Leonard, Australian rules football
 Joseph John Henry Leonard (1863–1929), Australian illustrator
 Joshua Leonard (born 1975), actor
 Justin Leonard (born 1972), American golfer
 Kawhi Leonard (born 1991), American basketball player
 Larry Leonard, American politician
 Lee Leonard (1929–2018), US TV personality
 Louise Wareham Leonard, American author

M–Z
 Marion Leonard (1881–1956), actress
 Mark Leonard (footballer), association football
 Marshall Leonard, soccer player
 Matthew Leonard (1929–1967), Medal of Honor recipient
 Meyers Leonard (born 1992), American basketball player
 Michael Leonard (disambiguation), several people
 Miriam Leonard, British professor of Greek literature
 Patricia Leonard (1936–2010), English opera singer
 Patrick James Leonard, Medal of Honor recipient
 Patrick Leonard (born 1956), American songwriter
 Patrick Thomas Leonard, Indian Wars Medal of Honor recipient
 Paul Leonard (politician), American politician
 Paul Leonard (writer), UK author
 Philippe Léonard, soccer
 Priscilla Leonard, pen name for Emily Perkins Bissell, an American social worker and activist
 Rick Leonard, American football
 Robert A. Leonard, American linguist known for his forensic work and former singer for Sha Na Na
 Robert Maynard Leonard (1869–1941), English journalist and editor
 Robert Sean Leonard (born 1969), actor
 Robert Z. Leonard (1889–1968), director
 Ronald Leonard, cellist
 Sarah Leonard (archer), archery
 Scott Leonard (born 1965), American musician
 Shaquille Leonard, American football
 Sheldon Leonard (1907–1997), American film and TV producer
 Silvio Leonard (born 1955), Cuban sprinter
 Sonny Leonard (1943–2021), American businessman
 Stan Leonard (1915–2005), Canadian golfer
 Stephen B. Leonard, American politician
 Steve Leonard (born 1972), English TV personality
 Sugar Ray Leonard (born 1956), American boxer
 Thomas Arthur Leonard, English pioneer of outdoor holidays
 Tom Leonard (Irish politician)
 Tom Leonard (poet) (1944–2018), Scottish poet
 Tony Leonard (born 1947), Australian radio presenter
 Turney W. Leonard, Medal of Honor recipient
 Vincent Leonard, Bishop of Pittsburgh
 William E. Leonard, American Civil War Medal of Honor recipient
 William Ellery Leonard (1876–1944), American poet
 William J. Leonard, American football
 William Leonard (Scottish politician)
 Wrexie Leonard, American astronomer
 Leonard (baseball), first name unknown, played in one Major League Baseball game in 1892

Fictional characters
 Anatole Leonard, in the Robotech series
 Leonard (demon), in the Dictionnaire Infernal
 Léonard, title character in the Belgian comic of the same name
 Leonard, a character from Total Drama: Pahkitew Island and The Ridonculous Race
 Leonard W. "Lennie" Briscoe, a detective in Law & Order
 Private Leonard Church, from Red vs. Blue
 Leonard Hofstadter, in The Big Bang Theory
 Leonard von Lahnstein, character from German soap opera Forbidden Love
 Lenny Leonard, in The Simpsons
 Lockie Leonard, in children's novels by Tim Winton
 Leonard McCoy, in the Star Trek series
 King Leonard Mudbeard, a ruler of Piggy Island and antagonist of The Angry Birds Movie
 Leonard Rollins, a character in Silver Spoons
 Lennie Small, in the novel Of Mice and Men
 Leonard Smith, a character in the American sitcom It's Garry Shandling's Show
 Leonard Snart, Captain Cold from The Flash comics and TV series
 Lenny Summers, a character from Red Dead Redemption 2

See also
 Lenard, surname
 Saint Leonard (disambiguation)
 St Leonards (disambiguation)

References

English-language masculine given names
English masculine given names
Masculine given names
English-language surnames